Baldwin Hills/Crenshaw is a neighborhood in the south region of the city of Los Angeles.  It is divided between the upscale, principally home-owning Baldwin Hills residential district to the south and a more concentrated apartment area to the north, just south of Jefferson Boulevard. A commercial corridor along Crenshaw Boulevard includes Baldwin Hills Crenshaw Plaza, Marlton Square and Crenshaw Boulevard.

History

19th century

Timeline

"Lucky" Baldwin: Baldwin Hills and other surrounding geography are named for the noted 19th-century horse racing and land development pioneer, Elias J. "Lucky" Baldwin.
Rancho La Cienega o Paso de la Tijera: historic early-19th-century eastern hills Rancho land grant.
Sanchez Adobe de Rancho La Cienega o Paso de la Tijera.  The adobe was once the center of the rancho. In the 1920s, an addition was built linking the structures and the building was converted into a larger clubhouse for the Sunset Golf Course.
Rancho Rincon de los Bueyes: original early-19th-century western section Rancho land grant.
Olympic Village: The Baldwin Hills were the site of the very first Olympic Village ever built, for the 1932 Los Angeles Summer Olympic Games. Built for male athletes only, the village consisted of several hundred buildings, including post offices and telegraph offices, an amphitheater, a hospital, a fire department, and a bank. Female athletes were housed at the Chapman Park Hotel on Wilshire Boulevard. The Olympic Village was demolished after the Summer Olympic Games.

Geography

Description
According to the Mapping L.A. project of the Los Angeles Times,  Baldwin Hills/Crenshaw is bounded by Culver City, Jefferson Park, Ladera Heights, View Park-Windsor Hills and West Adams. Areas within it are Baldwin Village, Baldwin Vista, The Dons and Village Green. The neighborhood limits, according to Mapping L.A, are Jefferson Boulevard on the north, Ballona Creek, Jefferson Boulevard and La Brea Avenue on the west, the Kenneth Hahn State Recreation Area and Stocker Street on the south and Crenshaw Boulevard on the east.

Neighborhoods

Baldwin Hills/Crenshaw contains several neighborhoods:

 Baldwin Hills
 Baldwin Hills Estates ("The Dons")
 Baldwin Vista
 Village Green
 An unincorporated portion outside Los Angeles city limits
 Baldwin Village
 Crenshaw
 Crenshaw Manor - Crenshaw Manor is bordered by Crenshaw Blvd to the east, W. Martin Luther King Jr. Blvd to the south, W. Exposition Blvd to the north, and Farmdale Avenue/Chesapeake Ave/Coliseum St. to the West.

Population

The 2000 U.S census counted 30,123 residents in Baldwin Hills/Crenshaw and its area of 2.88 square miles gave it a population density of 10,446 people per square mile, about average for Los Angeles and the county as a whole. In 2008 the city estimated that 32,234 people lived there. The median age was 36, older than the city as a whole. The percentage of residents aged 65 and older was among the county's highest.

Ethnic composition
The neighborhood was considered "moderately diverse" in 2000, with 71.3% of residents being of black or African-American ancestry, 17.3% Latino, 4.7% Asian, 3.3% white and 3.4% of other backgrounds. The neighborhood had the fifth-highest concentration of black residents in the city.

The average household size was 2.3 people, low compared to the city as a whole. Almost 32% of the 2,400 families living in Baldwin Hills-Crenshaw were headed by single parents, the third-highest rate in the city, after Watts and Vermont Knolls.

The median household income at $37,948 in 2008 dollars was low compared with both city and county populations. The percentage of households earning $20,000 or less a year was high for the county. The percentage of residents 25 and older with a high school education and some college was high for the county, Those with a college degree were about the same as the rest of the city and county.

The large number of veterans, 2,272 or 10.2% of the population, was high for both the city and the county. The percentage of veterans who served during World War II or the Korean War was among the county's highest.

Only 16.6% of the residents were foreign born, a low figure for both the city and the county. Mexico (31%) and El Salvador (16.8%) were the most common foreign places of birth.

Disasters

On December 14, 1963, a crack appeared in the Baldwin Hills Dam impounding the Baldwin Hills Reservoir. Within a few hours, water rushing through the crack eroded the earthen dam, gradually widening the crack until the dam failed catastrophically at 3:38 pm. Although the area had been evacuated after the crack had been discovered, several homes were destroyed, and most of Baldwin Vista and the historic Village Green community were flooded. The dam's failure was ultimately determined to be the result of subsidence, caused by overexploitation of the Inglewood Oil field. The dam's failure prompted the Los Angeles Department of Water and Power to close and drain other small local reservoirs with similar designs, such as the Silver Lake Reservoir. The Baldwin Hills Dam was not rebuilt—instead, the empty reservoir was demolished, filled with earth, landscaped, and converted to Kenneth Hahn Regional Park.

During the summer of 1985, an arsonist started a brush fire along La Brea Avenue. The fire spread up the canyon towards the expensive homes along Don Carlos Drive in the Baldwin Hills Estates tract. Many homes were destroyed despite the efforts of the Los Angeles Fire Department to suppress the flames. The fire killed three people and destroyed 69 homes; the arsonist was never caught.

Parks and recreation

 Baldwin Hills Scenic Overlook: The  park is open daily from 8 a.m. to sunset. The Visitor Center is open Thursday–Sunday from 10 a.m. to 5 p.m.  The park includes an amphitheater, drinking water, the Evan Frankel Discovery Center, gardening boxes, picnic tables, a permeable parking lot ($6), toilets, and walking paths with a central feature known as the Culver City Stairs. The Visitor Center has a guide to the native plants of the area and history of Culver City.
 Kenneth Hahn State Regional Park: recreation and sports areas, and preservation of the open-space lands and native habitats: entrance on South La Cienega Boulevard.
 Norman O. Houston Park
 Jim Gilliam Recreation Center

Government
The Los Angeles Fire Department Station 94 serves the neighborhood.

Library
The Los Angeles Public Library operates the Baldwin Hills Branch Library.

Notable people
 Richard Elfman and Danny Elfman, musicians
 Ice-T, rapper and actor
 Meghan Markle, Duchess of Sussex, actress and wife of Prince Harry, Duke of Sussex
 Darryl Strawberry, professional baseball player
 De'Anthony Thomas, professional football player

See also

 Baldwin Hills (mountain range)
 Baldwin Hills, Los Angeles
 South Los Angeles
 List of districts and neighborhoods in Los Angeles

References

External links
 Los Angeles Times: Baldwin Hills/Crenshaw area crime map and statistics

 

Baldwin Hills (mountain range)
Neighborhoods in Los Angeles
South Los Angeles